Howard Roberts Lamar (November 18, 1923 – February 22, 2023) was an American historian of the American West. In addition to being Sterling Professor of History Emeritus at Yale University since 1994, he served as Acting President of Yale University from 1992 to 1993.

Biography
Lamar was born in Tuskegee, Alabama, on November 18, 1923, and was drawn into history in part by his rich family history which includes two United States Supreme Court justices and the second president of the Republic of Texas. He received his B.A. from Emory University in 1945 and his Ph.D. from Yale University in 1951. He was president of Yale from 1992 to 1993, and since 1994 has been a Sterling Professor of History Emeritus at Yale.  His prominent students include Lewis L. Gould. 

The Howard R. Lamar Center for the Study of Frontiers and Borders at Yale University was established in his honor.

Lamar died on February 22, 2023, at the age of 99.

Bibliography
Dakota Territory, 1861–1889
The Cruise of the Portsmouth, 1845–1847
The Far Southwest, 1846–1912: A Territorial History
The Trader on the American Frontier: Myth’s Victim
The New Encyclopedia of the American West
Charlie Siringo's West: An Interpretive Biography

See also
List of presidents of Yale University

Notes

References
 Gould, Lewis L. (2000). "Howard Roberts Lamar" in Clio's Favorites: Leading Historians of the United States, 1945–2000 (Robert Allen Rutland, ed.). Columbia: University of Missouri Press.
 Kelley, Brooks Mather. (1999).  Yale: A History. New Haven: Yale University Press. ; OCLC 810552

External links 
 Howard Roberts Lamar Papers. Yale Collection of Western Americana, Beinecke Rare Book and Manuscript Library.

1923 births
2023 deaths
People from Tuskegee, Alabama
Presidents of Yale University
Yale Sterling Professors
21st-century American historians
21st-century American male writers
Historians of the American West
American male non-fiction writers
Emory University alumni
Yale University alumni
Writers from Alabama